The Paradise Marsh Wildlife Area is a  tract of protected land located in Columbia County, Wisconsin, managed by the Wisconsin Department of Natural Resources (WDNR). Land to be used for the Wildlife Area was first acquired in 1962 with the hopes of improving the habitat conditions for various waterfowl. In addition to conservation of wildlife, plans for further draining the marsh were laid out, with the marsh previously being drained as early as the early 1900's.

Paradise Marsh
The marsh itself is considered by the WDNR to be a satellite marsh for the significantly larger Horicon National Wildlife Refuge. While one of the original objectives of the marsh was to drain the marsh and increase drainage ability after flooding, extensive ditch-digging and repeated excavations of the area have caused the Wildlife Area's condition to deteriorate. A water control structure and dike are now in place in the marsh to prevent further degradation.

Flora and Fauna
The most prominent species of trees that can be found in the Wildlife Area are Oak and Hickory, in addition to various hardwood trees and savanna trees native to the region. The expansion of cattails is of particular concern for the WDNR, as well as other invasive plant species.

A popular activity in the Wildlife Area is trapping, with there being a sizable population of both mink and muskrat in the Marsh. Hunting is also popular, with most of it taking place in the sunflower fields, planted specifically to create a habitat for mourning doves.

See also
 Columbus
 Marsh

References

External links
 U.S. Geological Survey Map at the U.S. Geological Survey Map Website. Retrieved March 1st, 2022.

State Wildlife Area
Protected areas of Wisconsin
Geography of Columbia County, Wisconsin
Protected areas established in 1962